Centre d'Art Santa Mònica (CASM), more commonly abbreviated as Arts Santa Mònica, is a public venue in Barcelona, (Catalonia) opened in 1988, for exhibiting contemporary art. It is located in the Raval side of Rambla de Santa Mònica (Ciutat Vella district). It hosts a number of exhibitions of contemporary Spanish and international artists every year. Entrance is free.

The building that hosts CASM is a 1626 Renaissance convent that became a monument of national interest in 1984.

See also
List of museums in Barcelona

References

External links

Museums in Barcelona
Art museums and galleries in Catalonia
Art museums established in 1988
Ciutat Vella
La Rambla, Barcelona
1988 establishments in Spain
Modern art museums in Spain
Modern art museums in Catalonia